Archibald Stobo Bulloch (January 1, 1730 – February 22, 1777) was an American lawyer, military officer and politician who served as the first governor of Georgia from 1776 to 1777. Born in the Province of Georgia, Bulloch fought in the Georgia Militia during the American Revolution, and was also a great-grandfather of Martha Bulloch Roosevelt, and great-great-grandfather of Theodore Roosevelt, the 26th President of the United States.

Early life

Bulloch was born in 1730 in Charleston, South Carolina. He was the son of James Bulloch (1701–1780) and his wife Jean (daughter of Rev Archibald Stobo), both Scots, and was named after his maternal grandfather. After receiving his education in Charleston, he began to practice law and was commissioned as a lieutenant in the South Carolina militia.

The Bulloch family moved to the Province of Georgia in 1758, where in 1764 Bulloch moved to Savannah. He was elected to the colonial legislature in 1768.

Revolution
Bulloch was an early supporter of the revolution in Georgia as a member of the Friends of Liberty. He served as President of the 1st and 2nd Provincial Congresses of Georgia, and was a delegate in 1775 to the Continental Congress. There, he won John Adams's praise for his "Abilities and Fortitude". In the Continental Congress, he was a member of the Secret Committee, which was responsible for gathering war supplies. Speaking to the Provincial Congress, Bulloch said, "This is no time to talk of moderation; in the present instance it ceases to be a virtue."

Bulloch is also recorded as having been a Freemason in Georgia.  His name is listed on the 1779 Masonic rolls of Solomon's Lodge No. 1 at Savannah along with George Walton, John Adam Treutlen, James Jackson, Nathaniel Pendelton, and General Samuel Elbert.

Bulloch would have been a signer of the Declaration of Independence, but decided to return to Georgia to aid the revolution there. He wrote to John Adams, "Such a series of Victory having attended the American Arms, emboldens us further to trust in Providence, that has so remarkably interposed in our behalf, and we cannot but entertain the most sanguine Hopes, of still preserving our most invaluable Liberties." Adams was disappointed that Bulloch would not be able to sign the Declaration, saying, "I was greatly disappointed, Sir, in the information you gave me, that you should be prevented from revisiting Philadelphia."

In 1776, Bulloch fought under the command of Colonel Lachlan McIntosh in the Battle of the Rice Boats and the Battle of Tybee Island. On June 20, 1776, he was chosen to be the first President and Commander-in-Chief of Georgia under the state's temporary republican government. When he signed the state constitution on February 20, 1777, his position transferred from president to governor of Georgia. He was thus Georgia's first chief executive under a proper constitutional government, but the third chief executive in all, following the brief tenures of presidents William Ewen and George Walton.

Personal life
On October 10, 1764, Bulloch was married to Mary De Veaux (1748–1818), the daughter of Ann (née Fairchild) De Veaux and Col. James De Veaux, a prominent Savannah landowner. Together, they were the parents of:

 William Bellinger Bulloch (1777–1852), who later represented Georgia in the United States Senate.

Bulloch died in Savannah while preparing to defend against the British invasion of Georgia in 1777. There is some speculation that he was poisoned, although this has never been proven. His death was a severe blow, as his was the only leadership that united the Whig factions in the troubled young state.  He is buried in Savannah's Colonial Park Cemetery.

Legacy

Archibald's great-great-grandson was President Theodore Roosevelt. His great-great-great granddaughter was First Lady of the United States Eleanor Roosevelt. Theodore Roosevelt's son Archibald was named after his ancestor.

Bulloch County, Georgia is named after him.

References

External links

Article in ''New Georgia Encyclopedia
Archibald Bulloch historical marker

1730 births
1777 deaths
Bulloch family
Continental Congressmen from Georgia (U.S. state)
18th-century American politicians
People of Georgia (British colony)
Georgia (U.S. state) lawyers
Georgia (U.S. state) militiamen in the American Revolution
Governors of Georgia (U.S. state)
People of Georgia (U.S. state) in the American Revolution
Politicians from Savannah, Georgia
Independent state governors of the United States
Georgia (U.S. state) Independents
American slave owners